Charlie Dawes (born 13 September 1995) is an English footballer who plays for Worksop Town as a forward.

Career
Born in Chesterfield, Dawes started his career at Sheffield Wednesday and left Sheffield Wednesday to sign his first professional contract for one-year with Chesterfield.

Dawes made his professional début and first start for Chesterfield on 2 September 2014 in a 2–0 Football League Trophy defeat against Scunthorpe United, playing 74 minutes before being replaced by Jake Beesley. Dawes have spent throughout the season, playing in the club's reserve and being loaned out twice to get first team experience.

Dawes joined Matlock Town on loan for another month on 7 November 2014. Dawes' loan spell with Matlock Town was soon extended for another month. After finishing his loan spell at Matlock Town, Dawes was loaned out to Stalybridge Celtic for the second time this season for another month. Just one appearance, Dawes made his return to his parent club.

On 17 May 2015, Dawes was released by Chesterfield, having spent one season at the club since signing from Sheffield Wednesday. Following his release, Dawes has played in non-league for Matlock Town, Sheffield and Worksop Town.

Career statistics

References

External links

1995 births
Living people
Footballers from Chesterfield
English footballers
Association football forwards
Sheffield Wednesday F.C. players
Chesterfield F.C. players
Matlock Town F.C. players
Stalybridge Celtic F.C. players